Qarah Mohammad or Qareh Mohammad, also rendered as Qara Mohammad or Qara Muhammad or Ghareh Mohammad or Kara-Mukhammed, may refer to:

Places
 Qareh Mohammad, Kurdistan
 Qarah Mohammad, Razavi Khorasan
 Qarah Mohammad, Khodabandeh, Zanjan Province
 Qarah Mohammad, Bizineh Rud, Khodabandeh County, Zanjan Province

Persons
 Qara Mahammad Töremish, a bey of Kara Koyunlu and father of Qara Yusuf.

See also
 Qarah Mohammad Tappeh